Tubolaimoididae is a family of nematodes belonging to the order Leptolaimida.

Genera:
 Chitwoodia Gerlach, 1956
 Tubolaimoides Gerlach, 1963

References

Nematodes